Molly Root Brearley CBE (28 March 1905–27 March 1994) was a British educationist, teacher and writer. She led the Froebel Educational Institute from 1955 and 1970. She established the Froebel Nursery and a matching Froebel Nursery Research Project. The 1969 book Fundamentals in the First School was created with her at the helm.

Life 
Brearley was born in Hastings in 1905. Her parents were  Mabel Daisy and Dr Herman Brearley and she was their first child. Her mother was a pianist and piano teacher and her father was an organist and a professor of music. Her schooling was excellent until she was eleven. She attended a small private school where the constant nature walks and discussions about paintings meant that the teacher never lost her interest. When she was eleven the family moved north where her father was Blackburn Cathedral's organist. Brearley went to Blackburn high school where she studied to enter university.

In 1928 she graduated from Liverpool University with an English degree and a teacher's certificate. Her first job was teaching at Kettering Girls' High School.

In 1955 she was appointed to lead the Froebel Educational Institute. The previous Principal was Eglantyne Mary Jebb Brearley brought to a role a very wide range of experience. She had knowledge of Piaget and Froebel's work . She had taught and lectured and volunteered with the Girl Guides and the Brownies.

Brearley created courses where teachers could gain diplomas and the college became involved in cross-curricula Batchelor of Edication courses. In their first year students would learn about child development while at the same time learning about subjects like maths and science.
 
Brearly was award a CBE in 1965 for her services to education. In the following year A Teacher's Guide to Reading Piaget was published. She had co-written the book with Elizabeth Hitchfield.

The college's ideas were contained in, Fundamentals in the First School, which was a book where Brearley chaired the authors and then she and Raymond Bott editted and published in 1969. The book included six generalisations which can be summarised as 1. Children are individuals, 2. Pupils construct their mind through interactions 3. Learning is continuative anf Knowledge is cumularive 4. The concept that children have "stages" is useful 5. Children who cooperate will collaborate to gain knowledge and 6. the search for knowledge is self-propelling.

Brearley retired in 1970.

Molly Brearley and Dame Joyce Bishop obtained funding from the Leverhulme Foundation to create a one year study of Project for the Study of Educational Failure in Underprivileged Children in 1971 to 1972. Brearly and Bishop established a Free nursery in the college's grounds. The Froebel Research Nursery School started to be used in 1973 as part of the Froebel Nursery Research Project. They persuaded Froebel lecturer Chris Athey to lead the nursery and the work which ran until 1978. As a result Athey published Extending Thought in Young Children in 1990.

Brearley died in Warwick one day short of her birthday.

References 

1905 births
1994 deaths
People from Hastings
Education activism